David "Dave" Fatum (born August 4, 1968, in Prince Rupert, British Columbia) is a Canadian-American professional darts player who plays in Professional Darts Corporation events. His nickname is The Scorpion. He is not a full-time professional and makes his living as a paramedic firefighter.

Career

Fatum's first major exposure came in the 2008 PDC US Open where he reached the semi finals losing to Colin Lloyd. In his third-round game, he defeated Davis Snider who had earlier beaten North American Darts champion Darin Young and former BDO world champion Steve Beaton. He then beat Stephen Panuncialman who beat Paul Lim in the third round. He then secured wins over Bill Davis and Chris Mason before eventually bowing out to Lloyd.

His performance contributed to him finishing 3rd in the American order of merit, earning him a place in the 2009 PDC World Darts Championship. He defeated Shane O'Connor in the preliminary round, but was beaten by Wayne Mardle in the first round.

Fatum is a winner 2018 Greater Vancouver Open Champions he beats John Downs.
Other titles include Dartslive World Stage- Hong Kong, IDF World Cup Singles, Dartslive North American Tour Championship, CDC Matchplay, Medalist World Doubles, Bullshooter Singles Champion, NDA Team Dart Singles Champion

World Championship Results

PDC
 2009: First round (lost to Wayne Mardle 0–3) (sets)

External links
Profile and stats on Darts Database

1968 births
American darts players
Canadian emigrants to the United States
Living people
Canadian darts players
People from Prince Rupert, British Columbia
Professional Darts Corporation associate players
British Darts Organisation players